A  court jester is a type of entertainer.

Court jester may also refer to:

 The Court Jester, a 1956 film
 The Court Jesters, an improv company
 The Court Jesters (band)
 Court Jester goby, a species of fish
 Court jester hypothesis, in evolutionary biology

See also
 Jester (disambiguation)